Parabradysaurus is an extinct genus of estemmenosuchid dinocephalians. It is known from a few serrated teeth that indicate this animal was like herbivorous.

See also

 List of therapsids

References

 The main groups of non-mammalian synapsids at Mikko's Phylogeny Archive

Tapinocephalians
Prehistoric therapsid genera
Permian synapsids of Asia
Prehistoric synapsids of Europe
Guadalupian synapsids
Fossil taxa described in 1954
Taxa named by Ivan Yefremov
Wordian genus first appearances
Wordian genus extinctions